Pasta con i peperoni cruschi is an Italian pasta dish flavored with peppers and typical of the Basilicata region.

Description 
The main ingredient is peperone crusco, a dried and crunchy pepper known for its sweet flavour and intense colour, which is a popular element in the local cuisine. Usually the Senise pepper variety is used, for its thin pulp and low water content which allows a rapid drying.

Preparation 
The peppers are cleaned with a dry cloth, deprived of the stalk and the seeds to be subsequently flash-fried in hot olive oil, flavoured with a garlic clove which is removed before the cooking. The frying takes just a few seconds, and they must be immediately extracted to avoid burns that compromise the flavour, giving an unpleasant taste. 

The bread crumbs are browned in the same oil. When the  pasta is cooked, the ingredients are mixed, and finally seasoned with some peppers. Optionally, cheeses like pecorino or cacioricotta, and parsley can be added.

See also 
 Cuisine of Basilicata
 List of pasta dishes

Notes 

Pasta dishes
Vegetable dishes
Cuisine of Basilicata
Vegetarian cuisine
Vegan cuisine
Peasant food